Freedom of the Seas is a 1934 British comedy war film directed by Marcel Varnel and starring Clifford Mollison, Wendy Barrie and Zelma O'Neal. It was adapted by Roger Burford from the West End play of the same name by Walter C. Hackett.

Production
Produced by British International Pictures, the film was shot at Elstree Studios with sets designed by the art director Cedric Dawe.  It was French director Varnel's first film in Britain following a spell in Hollywood. He went on to be a prominent maker of comedies during the following decade, working with Will Hay, George Formby and others. It is also notable as David Lean's first film credit, as focus puller.

Plot
Smith, a mild-mannered clerk, unexpectedly becomes one of the first among his colleagues to sign up on the declaration of World War I.  Undashing but courageous, he foils a German sabotage plot.

Cast
Clifford Mollison as Smith 
Wendy Barrie as Phyllis Harcourt 
Zelma O'Neal as Jennie 
H. F. Maltby as Harcourt 
Tyrell Davis as Cavendish 
James Carew as Bottom 
Cecil Ramage as Berkstrom 
Henry Wenman as Wallace 
Frederick Peisley as Jackson 
Frank Atkinson as O'Hara 
Charles Paton as Gamp

References

Bibliography
 Goble, Alan. The Complete Index to Literary Sources in Film. Walter de Gruyter, 1999.

External links

Review from the New York Times

1934 films
British black-and-white films
Films shot at British International Pictures Studios
British films based on plays
Films directed by Marcel Varnel
World War I naval films
Seafaring films
Films set in London
British war films
1934 war films
1930s English-language films
1930s British films